Sex Kittens Go to College (a.k.a. Beauty and the Robot) is a 1960 American comedy film by Allied Artists Pictures, produced and directed by Albert Zugsmith and starring Mamie Van Doren, Tuesday Weld and Mijanou Bardot. The film was also released in adult theaters with an additional nine-minute dream sequence showcasing the robot Sam Thinko with striptease dancers.

Plot
Collins College's administrators are expecting new professor Dr. Mathilda West, who holds 13 degrees and speaks 18 languages.

Dr. West, a buxom blonde, has an effect on everybody, from public relations director George Barton, who is the boyfriend of jealous dean Myrtle Carter, to football star Woo Woo Grabowski, who becomes nervous around beautiful women, including student Jody, who loves him.

A campus computer, affectionately known as Thinko, has a knack for knowing the future, including winning lottery numbers and race horses. A hoodlum, Legs Rafertino, comes looking for Thinko, thinking that it is a bookie, while foreign exchange student Suzanne tries to interview Legs for her thesis.

Barton exposes that Dr. West was once the stripper known as Tallahassee Tassel Tosser. The school's primary benefactor, Admiral Wildcat MacPherson, is concerned. Dr. West defends her former occupation and even provides a tassel demonstration that hypnotizes several of the men.

Woo Woo wins enough money on Thinko's gambling advice to marry Jody and buy a car. Myrtle dyes her hair blond and woos Wildcat MacPherson. Not wanting to stay where she is not wanted, Dr. West prepares to leave town, only to have Barton steal a fire engine and race to catch up with her.

Cast

 Mamie Van Doren as Dr. Mathilda West
 Tuesday Weld as Jody
 Mijanou Bardot as Suzanne
 John Carradine as Professor Watts
 Jackie Coogan as Wildcat MacPherson
 Babe London as Miss Cadwallader
 Pamela Mason as Dr. Myrtle Carter
 Martin Milner as George Barton
 Louis Nye as Dr. Zorch
 Mickey Shaughnessy as Boomie
 Allan Drake as Legs Raffertino
 Conway Twitty as himself
 Vampira as Etta Toodie
 Norman Grabowski as Woo Woo Grabowski
 Charles Chaplin Jr. as Fire chief (Uncredited)
 Harold Lloyd Jr. as Policeman (Uncredited)

Production
The film was known during production as Teacher Versus Sexpot.

The part of Thinko the robot was played by an actual robot, Elektro, built by Westinghouse in 1937.

See also
 List of American films of 1960

References

External links
 
 
Joe Dante on Sex Kittens Go to College at Trailers from Hell

1960 films
1960 comedy films
American comedy films
American black-and-white films
Films set in universities and colleges
Allied Artists films
Films scored by Dean Elliott
1960s English-language films
Films directed by Albert Zugsmith
1960s American films